Nicolaas Pretorius (born 8 August 1989) is a South African cricketer. He made his Twenty20 cricket debut for Munster Reds in the 2017 Inter-Provincial Trophy in Ireland on 26 May 2017.

References

External links
 

1989 births
Living people
South African cricketers
Munster Reds cricketers
Cricketers from Pretoria